Andrieșeni is a commune in Iași County, Western Moldavia, Romania. It is composed of seven villages: Andrieșeni, Buhăeni, Drăgănești, Fântânele, Glăvănești, Iepureni and Spineni.

Natives
Pavel Coruț

References

Communes in Iași County
Localities in Western Moldavia